23rd Division may refer to:

Infantry divisions 
 Finnish 23rd Division (Winter War), part of Finnish II Corps
 23rd Division (German Empire)
 23rd Reserve Division (German Empire)
 23rd Infantry Division (Wehrmacht)
 23rd Waffen Mountain Division of the SS Kama (2nd Croatian), Germany
 23rd Infantry Division (India)
 23rd Infantry Division Ferrara, Kingdom of Italy
 23rd Division (Imperial Japanese Army)
 23rd Infantry Division (Poland)
 23rd Infantry Division (Ottoman Empire)
 23rd Division (South Vietnam)
 23rd Division (United Kingdom)
 23rd (Northumbrian) Division, United Kingdom
 23rd Infantry Division (United States)
 23rd Takavar Division (Iranian Army)

Armoured divisions 
 23rd Panzer Division (Wehrmacht)
 23rd SS Volunteer Panzer Grenadier Division Nederland

Cavalry divisions 

 23rd Cavalry Division (United States)

Aviation divisions 
 23rd Air Division (United States)

See also 
 23rd Brigade (disambiguation)